Laneuveville-devant-Nancy (literally Laneuveville before Nancy) is a commune in the Meurthe-et-Moselle department in north-eastern France, which includes the former commune of La Madeleine, notable for manufacturing terra sigillata Ancient Roman pottery.

Population

See also
 Communes of the Meurthe-et-Moselle department

References

Laneuvevilledevantnancy